Michel Boyibanda is a soukous recording artist, composer, and vocalist in the Republic of the Congo. He was once a member of the Congolese Rumba band TPOK Jazz, led by François Luambo Makiadi, which dominated the Congolese music scene from the 1950s through the 1980s.

Partial discography
 Ata Na Yebi (1966)
 Samba Toko Samba (1966)
 Andu Wa Andura (1971)
 Ba Soucis Na Week-End (1971)
 Osaboté Ngai Jean-Jean (1971)
 Zando Ya Tipo-Tipo (1974)
 Nzete Esololaka Na Moto Te (1975)

See also
 Franco Luambo Makiadi
 Sam Mangwana
 Josky Kiambukuta
 Simaro Lutumba
 Ndombe Opetum
 Youlou Mabiala
 Mose Fan Fan
 Wuta Mayi
 TPOK Jazz
 List of African musicians

References

External links
 Overview of Composition of TPOK Jazz

Living people
Democratic Republic of the Congo musicians
TPOK Jazz members
Year of birth missing (living people)

boyibanda Michel que interpretou a famos 

Cação "café ikola" do Franco luambo que deu sucésso nos anos

1967  mais de 2 millions de discos vendido na europa e na america latina